This is the list of municipalities in Kütahya Province, Turkey, .

Municipalities and mayors 
List is sorted alphabetically A-Z, as Districts->Municipalities.

References 

Geography of Kütahya Province
Kutahya